St Christopher's Church is in the small village of Pott Shrigley, Cheshire, England.  The church is recorded in the National Heritage List for England as a designated Grade I listed building.  It is an active Anglican parish church in the diocese of Chester, the archdeaconry of Macclesfield and the deanery of Macclesfield.

History

The church was originally a chapel of ease for the parish of Prestbury.  It was probably founded in the late 14th century and completed in its present form with the building of the Downes chantry chapel. The east window was restored in 1872.

Architecture

Exterior

The plan consists of a west tower, a short nave of two bays, wide north and south aisles and a chancel.  The tower is relatively large for the size of the church, with battlements and pinnacles and a four-faced clock dated 1809 made by Thomas Schofield of Manchester.  The roofs of the nave and chancel are original and in good condition; the nave roof is camber beam in type and a dormer window has been added to it at a later date. The roofs of the aisles were plastered over in early Georgian times.  The style of the architecture is almost entirely Perpendicular.

Interior

Some of the box pews were moved from St James' Church, Gawsworth when that church was restored in the 19th century.  A holy table in the north aisle is dated 1695, and the altar rails are also from an early date.  The font is of grey marble and probably dates from the late 18th century.  Two sanctuary chairs date from the late 17th century.  The Royal arms of George III are placed over the chancel arch.  The monuments are mainly to the Downes and Lowther families.  One of these, dated 1798 is by John Bacon, and another, dated 1840 is by A. Gatley.  The east window contains much original glass despite the 1872 restoration by Clayton and Bell.

There is a ring of six bells.  The two earliest date from around 1499 and are thought to be by Robert Crouch; a bell dated 1607 is by Henry Oldfield II and another dated 1796 is by Edward Arnold.  The newest bells were cast in 1986 by Eijsbouts.  The parish registers for baptisms begin in 1629; burials and marriages were added in 1685.  The churchwardens' accounts start in 1833.

External features

In the churchyard is an ancient preaching cross, the base consisting of two large square blocks which are probably medieval.  The tall octagonal shaft and cross piece were possibly added when the cross was repaired in the late 18th or early 19th century.  The cross is listed at Grade II, and is a scheduled monument.

Bells

The original bells are a ring of three by Robert Crowch, each bearing his mark and the three leopard badge of the Plantagenets. They are reported to date from 1439, in the reign of Henry VI, but the tenor was recast in 1607 by Henry Oldfield of Birmingham, and Crouch's marks have been lost.
Inscriptions in English Black letter are as follows:

Treble: "Sancte Xstophere ora pro nobis" – St. Christopher pray for us
2nd: "Nomen Magdalene gerit campana melodie" – In the name of Magdalene make a joyous ring.

See also

 Grade I listed buildings in Cheshire East
 Grade I listed churches in Cheshire
 Listed buildings in Pott Shrigley

References

External links

 Photographs by Craig Thornber
 Medieval stained glass information from CVMA
 Photographs of St Christopher's Church

Church of England church buildings in Cheshire
Grade I listed churches in Cheshire
English Gothic architecture in Cheshire
Diocese of Chester
Scheduled monuments in Cheshire